The Beautiful Sinner is a 1924 American silent Western film directed by W. S. Van Dyke and starring William Fairbanks, Eva Novak and George Nichols.

Cast
 William Fairbanks as Henry Avery 
 Eva Novak as Alice Carter 
 George Nichols as Benson 
 Kate Lester as Mrs Cornelius Westervelt 
 Carmen Phillips as Carmen De Santas 
 Edward W. Borman as Blinky 
 Carl Stockdale as Bill Parsons

References

External links
 

1924 films
1924 Western (genre) films
1920s English-language films
American black-and-white films
Columbia Pictures films
Films directed by W. S. Van Dyke
Silent American Western (genre) films
1920s American films